Lo que la vida me robó (English title: What Life Took From Me) is a Mexican telenovela produced by Angelli Nesma Medina for Televisa, broadcast by Canal de las Estrellas (now known simply as Las Estrellas). The series originally aired from October 28, 2013, to July 27, 2014. It is an adaptation of the 1983 telenovela Bodas de odio produced by Ernesto Alonso, which also inspired Amor real, produced by Carla Estrada in 2003.

The series stars Daniela Castro, Angelique Boyer, Sebastián Rulli, Luis Roberto Guzmán, Sergio Sendel, Rogelio Guerra, Eric del Castillo, Grettell Valdez, Alberto Estrella, Ana Bertha Espín, Juan Carlos Barreto, and Gabriela Rivero.

The telenovela tells the story of Montserrat, whom her mother has chosen to be the solution of the family's economic problems, forcing her to marry a wealthy young man.

Univision aired Lo que la vida me robó on November 18, 2013 weeknights at 9pm/8c replacing La Tempestad. The last episode was broadcast on August 15, 2014 with Hasta el fin del mundo replacing it on August 18, 2014.

Plot 
This story takes place in Aguazul, a fictional town in Campeche where Montserrat (Angelique Boyer) lives with her upper-class family. A beautiful young woman with a good social position, which makes her idealize having a rosy life. Montserrat is constantly manipulated by her mother, Graciela Giacinti (Daniela Castro), who only cares about social appearances and wealth. Her father, Lauro Mendoza (Rogelio Guerra) is a retired admiral with a severe heart condition. Due to that he is unable to see to their lands. Montserrat's older brother Dimitrio (Osvaldo Benavides), gambles extensively and their family is on the brink of financial ruin, unbeknownst to Montserrat. Montserrat has become the solution to the socio-economic problems of her family, as her mother has chosen her ideal husband, Sebastián de Icaza (Osvaldo de León), son of one of the most influential families in Aguazul; However, she is not willing to marry a man imposed for convenience, even less when in fact she is in love with another, José Luis (Luis Roberto Guzmán), a corporal of the Navy. Sebastian discovers Montserrat's illicit relationship and leaves her, prompting Montserrat to pressure Jose Luis to speak to her father about asking her hand in marriage. José Luis, for his part, feels that his courtship with Montserrat will never be approved, since deep down, he knows that the Mendoza family will never accept him, because he does not have a promising future to share with Montserrat. Instead he offers to run away with her, to which Montserrat begrudgingly agrees.

On the other hand, Alejandro (Sebastián Rulli), a farmhand from a nearby plantation and with a desire to excel, learns a truth; that his father is Don Benjamín Almonte (Alfredo Adame), a cruel, powerful and wealthy man, who on his deathbed has revealed this secret and changes his will, naming Alejandro his sole heir. However, Alejandro does not receive this news well and runs off to clear his mind, meeting Montserrat accidentally while she was waiting for Jose Luis—immediately falling in love. Graciela, having been the secret lover of Benjamin Almonte in the hopes he might leave her all of his wealth, becomes furious at hearing that Alejandro now owns it.

It is when Graciela in desperation openly asks Alejandro for financial help, that he agrees to support the Mendoza with their debts on the condition that she overlooks his illegitimate birth and allows him to get to know her daughter, to see if he can get her to fall in love with him. Graciela accepts the proposal, swearing that Montserrat will not find out about the deal. At the same time, Montserrat and José Luis are discovered in their relationship by Graciela and Dimitrio, who do not want to jeopardize the promising future that awaits them and give themselves the task of separating them. They do not take long to achieve their goal, causing Montserrat to change his perception of José Luis, when the authorities blame him for a murder he did not commit, he is arrested and locked up. Believing that he had abandoned her before they could run away, Montserrat becomes desolate.

When Graciela notes that Montserrat does not want to be romantically involved with Alejandro, she is forced to confess to her daughter the truth about her economic situation. Despite her principles and aware that it is the way to help her family not be completely ruined, Montserrat agrees to marry Alejandro. However, she feels guilty because she knows she is marrying just for money. On the other hand, Alejandro believes he has won her heart. Just when José Luis reappears to prove the truth about the injustice he suffered, Montserrat and Alejandro are married, and he is too late. Jose Luis pleads with Montserrat and asks her to run away with him again, and she agrees. Alejandro discovers that she intends to run away with Jose Luis the day of their wedding, and he promptly takes her back to his plantation. Determined to keep her as his wife he feels like the Mendoza family lead him astray, by pretending she had loved him. Montserrat and Alejandro clash many times, believing one had betrayed the other when the reality is they were manipulated by Graciela and Dimitrio. Slowly the truth comes to light and they begin to get along, finding a happy medium—that is, until Jose Luis shows up at Alejandro's plantation under the guise of the new foreman, determined to convince Montserrat to run away with him still. Alejandro, having never seen his face, quickly takes up a friendship with 'Antonio Olivares', the man who is after his wife.

Cast

Main 
 Daniela Castro as Graciela de Mendoza
 Angelique Boyer as Montserrat Mendoza
 Sebastián Rulli as Alejandro Almonte
 Luis Roberto Guzmán as José Luis Álvarez
 Sergio Sendel as Pedro Medina
 Rogelio Guerra as Lauro Mendoza
 Eric del Castillo as Padre Anselmo
 Grettell Valdez as María Zamudio
 Alberto Estrella as Juventino Zamudio
 Ana Bertha Espín as Rosario Domínguez
 Juan Carlos Barreto as Macario
 Gabriela Rivero as Carlota Mendonza
 Luis Uribe as Capitán Robledo
 Osvaldo Benavides as Dimitrio Mendoza
 Verónica Jaspeado as Josefina Valverde
 Margarita Magaña as Esmeralda
 Carlos de la Mota as Refugio Solares
 Alejandro Ávila as Víctor
 Alejandra García as Nadia
 Ferdinando Valencia as Adolfo Argüelles Miranda / El Alacrán
 Marco Uriel as Efraín Loreto
 Isabella Camil as Amelia Betrand
 Luis Xavier as Joaquín Aréchiga
 Ilithya Manzanilla as Angélica
 Natalia Juárez as Virginia
 Alejandra Procuna as Dominga García
 Alexis Ayala as Ezequiel Basurto

Special participation 
 Luis Gatica as Bruno Gamboa
 Rafael Amador as Teniente
 Juan Romanca as Gaspar Zamudio
 Ricardo Vera as Licenciado
 Iván Caraza as Tomás Valverde
 Osvaldo de León as Sebastián de Icaza
 Ana Layevska as Cecilia Solares
 Patricia Conde as Prudencia Robledo
 Ricardo Kleinbaum as Samuel Barajas
 Lisset as Fabiola
 Francisco Gattorno as Sandro Narváez
 Ibernik Rabinowicz as Angel Solares (3 month old)

Guest stars 
 Alfredo Adame as Benjamín Almonte

Production

Filming 
The filming of the telenovela officially began on August 2, 2013, in the state of Campeche, Mexico. The first actors confirmed apart from Sebastián Rulli and Angelique Boyer were Osvaldo Benavides, Grettell Valdez, who plays the role of the villain, Alexis Ayala, among others. Because the telenovela extended more in the production and chapters, several chapters were recorded in scenes of exteriors and in the Hacienda Uayamón, in Campeche, in which the temperatures were of 30 degrees, and they lasted 16 hours of work. A few weeks after the recordings began in 2013 in the state of Campeche, Mexico, the telenovela suspended the recordings due to the bad weather.

Several photos were posted on Twitter, some were taken on the beaches of Yucatán and historic streets as well as Telchac Puerto, Celestún and Mérida, Yucatán.

Ratings

Soundtrack

Awards and nominations

References

External links

2013 telenovelas
2013 Mexican television series debuts
Mexican telenovelas
Spanish-language telenovelas
Televisa telenovelas
2014 Mexican television series endings